Geoffrey Durnford Iliff was an Anglican missionary bishop in China from 1903 to 1920.

Illif was born into an  ecclesiastical family on 7 October 1867.  He was educated at St Edmund's School, Canterbury and ordained in 1892. He was a missionary in China from then until 1920, the last 17 years as Bishop of Shantung.  Returning to England he was the vicar of Goole until 1928 and Archdeacon of Hereford until 1941. He died on 10 June 1946.

References

1867 births
People educated at St Edmund's School Canterbury
Anglican missionary bishops in China
Archdeacons of Hereford
1946 deaths
20th-century Anglican bishops in China
Anglican bishops of Shantung